Blue Jasmine is a 2013 American black comedy-drama film written and directed by Woody Allen. It stars Cate Blanchett as a New York socialite, Jeanette "Jasmine" French, who falls into poverty and homelessness. Alec Baldwin, Louis C.K., Bobby Canavale, Andrew Dice Clay and Sally Hawkins feature in supporting roles. The film premiered in six theaters in New York and Los Angeles on July 26, 2013. Sony Picture Classics later gave it a wide release on August 23, in more than 1,200 theaters in the United States and Canada. The film has grossed a worldwide total of more than $97 million on a production budget of $18 million.
Rotten Tomatoes, a review aggregator, surveyed 223 reviews and judged 91 percent to be positive.

Blue Jasmine has garnered awards and nominations in a variety of categories with particular praise for Blanchett's portrayal of the titular protagonist. At the 2014 Academy Awards ceremony, Blue Jasmine had three nominations: Best Actress for Blanchett, Best Supporting Actress for Hawkins and Best Original Screenplay for Allen. Blanchett was the sole winner. At the 2014 Golden Globe Awards ceremony, the film had two nominations: Best Actress in a Motion Picture – Drama for Blanchett and Best Supporting Actress – Motion Picture for Hawkins, with Blanchett going on to win. Blanchett also won Best Actress at the BAFTAs, Screen Actors Guild Awards, Independent Spirit Awards and Satellite Awards. Allen's screenplay was also nominated at the Writers Guild of America Awards.

Accolades

 Certain award groups do not simply award one winner. They recognize several different recipients and have runners-up. Since this is a specific recognition and is different from losing an award, runner-up mentions are considered wins in this award tally. Each date is linked to the article about the awards held that year, wherever possible.

See also
2013 in film

References

External links
 

Lists of accolades by film